Jhansa is a town in Kurukshetra in the north Indian state of Haryana. It is situated on the banks of the Shri Markanda River. Nearby cities include Shahabad (18 km away), Pehowa, and Kurukshetra (20 km away). Jhansa is run by the Gram panchayat of Jhansa. The primary occupation of its people is agriculture. The surrounding villages are Shanti Nagar, Rohti, Tangore, Mega Majra Gogpur, and Ajrana. The approximate population of Jhansa is 10,000.

 Cities and towns in Kurukshetra district